Eline McGeorge (born 1970) is a Norwegian artist who lives and works in London and Oslo, Norway. She has exhibited extensively in Norway and internationally.

Biography
McGeorge was born 1970. She received her Master of Fine Arts in 2000 from Goldsmiths, University of London in London, England. McGeorge takes use of drawing, animation, collage, artist books and weaving. Her work spans abstraction, concrete references and documentary with democratic problems, environmental issues, feminist legacy and science fiction as core thematic focuses.

Solo exhibitions
 Oslo Kunstforening, Oslo (2016)
 Hollybush Gardens, London (2012) 
 Galleri Kirkhoff, Copenhagen (2008)
 Fotogalleriet, Oslo (2007)

Selected group exhibitions
 Centre Georges Pompidou, Paris (2017)
 Dr. Bhau Daji Lad Museum, Mumbai (2015)
 Henie Onstad Kunstsenter, Oslo (2014) 
 David Risley Gallery, Copenhagen (2012–13)
 Focus Frieze Art Fair, London (2012)
 Momentum (Moss), Moss (2009)
 B Hotel at the  Museum of Modern Art PS1 New York in 2009.

Collections
McGeorge's work is included in the permanent collection of the Limerick City Gallery of Art and the Zabludowicz Collection. She is also in the permanent collection of the Barcelona Museum of Contemporary Art.

References

External links
 Official website

1970 births
Living people
21st-century Norwegian women artists
Alumni of Goldsmiths, University of London
21st-century Norwegian artists